Lucy Soutter (born 17 March 1967 in Cirencester, Gloucestershire, United Kingdom) is a former professional squash player from England. She was part of the successful England team that won the 1987 Women's World Team Squash Championships in Auckland, New Zealand and the 1990 Women's World Team Squash Championships in Perth, Australia.

Soutter was runner-up at the British Open in 1987, where she lost in the final to Susan Devoy of New Zealand 2–9, 4–9, 9–4, 9–2, 9–1.  She won the British National Squash Championship title in 1983, 1985 and 1989. She won the ICI Perspex World Masters title in 1984 beating the World no. 1, Susan Devoy, 9-0, 2-9, 9-2, 6-9, 9-5.

References

External links
 

English female squash players
People from Cirencester
Living people
Sportspeople from Gloucestershire
1967 births